Neoterebra alagoensis is a species of sea snail, a marine gastropod mollusk in the family Terebridae, the auger snails.

References

 Terryn, Y. (2007). Terebridae: A Collectors Guide. Conchbooks & Natural Art. 59pp + plates.

External links
 Simone, L. R. L.; Cunha, C. M. (2012). Taxonomic study on the molluscs collected in Marion-Dufresne expedition (MD55) to. SE Brazil: Xenophoridae, Cypraeoidea, mitriforms and Terebridae (Caenogastropoda). Zoosystema 34(4): 745-781
 Fedosov, A. E.; Malcolm, G.; Terryn, Y.; Gorson, J.; Modica, M. V.; Holford, M.; Puillandre, N. (2020). Phylogenetic classification of the family Terebridae (Neogastropoda: Conoidea). Journal of Molluscan Studies

Terebridae
Gastropods described in 2007